Howard Kennedy (31 May 1892 – 1967) was a Canadian Army officer and the first Director of the United Nations Relief and Works Agency for Palestine Refugees in the Near East (UNRWA) from 1950 to 1951.

Kennedy was a leading engineer in Ottawa before World War II. Joining the Canadian Army in 1939, he rose to be Quartermaster-General in 1943–44.

See also
 List of Directors and Commissioners-General of the United Nations Relief and Works Agency for Palestine Refugees in the Near East

References

External links
Generals of World War II

1892 births
1967 deaths
UNRWA officials
Canadian generals
20th-century Canadian military personnel
Canadian officials of the United Nations
Canadian Army generals of World War II